The name Dujuan has been used to name four tropical cyclones in the northwestern Pacific Ocean. The name was contributed by China, and is an azalea.

 Typhoon Dujuan (2003) (T0313, 14W, Onyok) – hit near Hong Kong.
 Severe Tropical Storm Dujuan (2009) (T0912, 13W, Labuyo)
 Typhoon Dujuan (2015) (T1521, 21W, Jenny) – A super typhoon which brought exceptionally strong winds to the Yaeyama Islands and Taiwan.
 Tropical Storm Dujuan (2021) (T2101, 01W, Auring) - A weak tropical storm which brought heavy rains and flooding to the Philippines on mid-February.

Pacific typhoon set index articles